The Council of Ministers is the executive branch of the government of the unrecognized state Northern Cyprus, consisting of ministers. The council is chaired by the Prime Minister of Northern Cyprus and the ministers head executive departments of the government. The President of Northern Cyprus reserved the right to chair the Council of Ministers, albeit without voting. The maximum number of ministries, as defined by the constitution, is ten.

The Council of Ministers is appointed by the Prime Minister, and the program of the government needs to be read out in the Assembly of the Republic within a week of the appointment. The cabinet then needs to receive a vote of confidence by the majority of the members of the Assembly. A vote of no confidence can be initiated after three months has elapsed, by nine members of the Assembly.

Cabinet
The current council, 2nd Sucuoğlu cabinet, which replaced the 1st Sucuoğlu cabinet is appointed on 21 February 2022 by the president, Ersin Tatar. The cabinet consists of 10 ministers formed by a coalition of the National Unity Party (UBP), the Democratic Party (DP) and the Rebirth Party (YDP). UBP got 8 and DP and YDP got 1 minister each.

See also 
 List of cabinets of Northern Cyprus

Notes

 
National cabinets